RVA may refer to:
 Régie des Voies Aériennes de la République Démocratique du Congo
 Richmond, Virginia
 RVA Magazine, an art, music and opinion magazine for Richmond, VA
 Relative Virtual Address, a concept in the COFF format
 Rift Valley Academy, a boarding school outside of Nairobi, Kenya